Mordechai Zar (born 14 January 1914, died 15 November 1982) was an Israeli politician who served as a member of the Knesset for Mapai and its successors between 1959 and 1974.

Biography
Born in Mashhad in Iran, Zar made aliyah to Mandatory Palestine in 1935. He worked in construction and road paving, before starting work for the Employment Bureau in 1942. In 1946 he became director of the Mizrach Jew department of the Histadrut trade union. He also served as a member of Jerusalem Workers Council, and was director of its Culture Department. In addition, Zar was president of the Association of Iranian Jewish Immigrants, and chairman of the Jerusalem branch of the Sephardi Jewish Committee.

In 1955 he was elected to Jerusalem City Council, on which he served until 1965. In 1959 he was elected to the Knesset on the Mapai list. Although he lost his seat in the 1961 elections, he returned to the Knesset on 17 May 1963 as a replacement for the deceased Ami Assaf. He retained his seat in elections in 1965 and 1969 (by which time Mapai had formed the Alignment), before losing it in the 1973 elections.

Zar died in 1982 at the age of 68.

References

External links

1914 births
1982 deaths
Alignment (Israel) politicians
Iranian Jews
Israeli civil servants
Iranian emigrants to Mandatory Palestine
Israeli Labor Party politicians
Israeli people of Iranian-Jewish descent
Israeli trade unionists
Mapai politicians
Members of the 4th Knesset (1959–1961)
Members of the 5th Knesset (1961–1965)
Members of the 6th Knesset (1965–1969)
Members of the 7th Knesset (1969–1974)
People from Mashhad